{{DISPLAYTITLE:C9H14N2O3}}
The molecular formula C9H14N2O3 (molar mass: 198.219 g/mol, exact mass: 198.1004 u) may refer to:

 Metharbital
 Probarbital

Molecular formulas